Now, Then & Forever is the twentieth studio album by American band Earth, Wind & Fire, released on September 10, 2013, by Legacy Recordings/Sony Music. The album reached No. 11 on the US Billboard 200 and No. 6 on the Top R&B/Hip-Hop Albums chart.

Overview
This is the first Earth, Wind & Fire album without musical input from founder Maurice White, although he supplied a note in the album's liner notes:

Larry Dunn, a former Earth, Wind & Fire bandmember, features as a keyboardist on the album. A deluxe edition came coupled with a compilation album.

Singles
The track "Guiding Lights" rose to No. 16 on the Billboard Smooth Jazz Songs chart and No. 30 on the Billboard Adult R&B Songs chart. Another single, "My Promise", reached No. 28 on the Billboard Adult R&B Songs chart and No. 30 on the Billboard Adult Contemporary Songs chart.

Critical reception

Matt Bauer of Exclaim gave the album an eight out of ten rating, noting that "Now, Then & Forever is a more than worthy addition to the Earth Wind & Fire catalogue."
With a four out of five rating, Harry Guerin of RTÉ called Now, Then & Forever "One of the surprises of the year." Elias Leight of Popmatters wrote "Now, Then & Forever has all the old colors and grooves, an impeccable rhythm section, prominent guitars, and indomitable horns that trace and re-trace motifs, dancing rings around everything." With a three out of five stars rating, Gavin Martin of the Daily Mirror exclaimed "Elements of greatness remain but the songs aren't classics." 
Daryl Easlea of Record Collector gave a four out of five stars rating and found that "Now, Then And Forever, is a splendid diversion that recalls – in spirit alone, of course – Rick Rubin’s recent work with Black Sabbath. It also sounds like a lost album that should have come out after 1979’s I Am: a very shrewd approximation of the EWF we know and love, it’s crammed with sophisticated R&B, gossamer-light jazz and powerful, soulful vocals with a positive message. Andy Kellman of AllMusic gave a three out of five stars rating saying "Now, Then & Forever demonstrates the lasting value of the band's classic sound." With a three out of five rating the Daily Record called Now, Then & Forever "a worthy effort, and EWF are clearly using old glories as inspiration for the future."

Track listing

Personnel 
Adapted from the album's text.

Philip Bailey	— producer, executive producer, lead and background vocals, percussion
Trinity Bailey	— A&R
Jon Barnes — trumpet
Duane Benjamin	— trombone
Gary Bias	 — alto and tenor saxophones
Mathieu Bitton	— design
Terence Blanchard	— trumpet
Errol Cooney	— guitar
Sal Cracchiolo	— trumpet
Tishaun Dawson	— cover art, creative director
Reggie Dozier	— horn engineer
Larry Dunn	— engineer, Fender Rhodes, Hammond B3, handclapping, keyboards, Mini Moog, Moog synthesizer, grand piano, producer, soloist, synthesizer
Jennifer Feinberg — project director
Chuck Findley	— flugelhorn, trumpet
James Ford	— trumpet
Matthew Fronke	— trumpet
Siedah Garrett	— background vocals
Jerry Hey	— horn arrangements
J.R. Hutson	— producer
Dr. Billy Ingram — insert photography
Fred Jackson, Jr. — flute, tenor saxophone
Munyungo Jackson	— percussion
Austin Jacobs	— Producer, composer, keyboards, programming, synthesizer
Ralph Johnson — drums, percussion
Eric Jorgensen	— trombone
Wendell Kelly	— trombone
Paul Klingberg	— engineer
Nicholas Lane	— trombone
David Leach	— percussion
Daniel McClain	— background vocals
Jevon McGlory	— background vocals

Myron McKinley	— Fender Rhodes, keyboards, producer, synthesizer
Justin Merrill	— engineer
Gregory Moore	— guitar
Kenny Moran	— engineer, percussion engineer, synthesizer
Jarius Mozee	— guitars
Vernon Mungo	— vocal engineer
Morris O'Connor	— guitars
Jeremiah Olvera	— mixing assistant
Don Pace	— cover art
Ric'key Pageot	— keyboards, synthesizer
Justin Panariello	— producer
John Pappenbrook	— trumpet
Jim Parham	— project director
John Paris	— drums, background vocals
Dave Pensado	— mixing
Neil Pogue	— A&R
Neal H. Pogue	— additional production, engineer, handclapping, mixing, percussion, producer
Satnam Ramgotra	— tabla
David Rideau	— engineer
Darrin Simpson	— Producer, guitar, Hammond B3, handclapping, horn arrangements, keyboards, piano, programming, synthesizer
Damien Smith	— A&R
Jubu Smith	— guitars
Michael "Patches" Stewart	 — trumpet
Randee St. Nicholas	— photography
Juan F. "Jef" Villaluna	— guitar
Mark Visher	— baritone and tenor saxophones
Wait B	— handclapping, producer
Verdine White	— bass, executive producer, handclapping, mixing assistant
B David Whitworth — background vocals, percussion
Benjamin Wright	— conductor, horn arrangements
Reggie Young	— bass and tenor trombones

Charts

Weekly charts

Year-end charts 

Singles - Billboard (US)

Certifications

References

2013 albums
Earth, Wind & Fire albums
Albums produced by Philip Bailey